In glaciology, an ice sheet, also known as a continental glacier, is a mass of glacial ice that covers surrounding terrain and is greater than . The only current ice sheets are in Antarctica and Greenland; during the Last Glacial Period at Last Glacial Maximum, the Laurentide Ice Sheet covered much of North America, the Weichselian ice sheet covered Northern Europe and the Patagonian Ice Sheet covered southern South America.

Ice sheets are bigger than ice shelves or alpine glaciers. Masses of ice covering less than 50,000 km2 are termed an ice cap. An ice cap will typically feed a series of glaciers around its periphery.

Although the surface is cold, the base of an ice sheet is generally warmer due to geothermal heat. In places, melting occurs and the melt-water lubricates the ice sheet so that it flows more rapidly. This process produces fast-flowing channels in the ice sheet — these are ice streams.

The present-day polar ice sheets are relatively young in geological terms. The Antarctic Ice Sheet first formed as a small ice cap (maybe several) in the early Oligocene, 33.9-23.0 Ma, but retreated and advanced many times until the Pliocene, 5.33-2.58Ma, when it came to occupy almost all of Antarctica. The Greenland ice sheet did not develop at all until the late Pliocene, but apparently developed very rapidly with the first continental glaciation. This had the unusual effect of allowing fossils of plants that once grew on present-day Greenland to be much better preserved than with the slowly forming Antarctic ice sheet.

Antarctic ice sheet

The Antarctic ice sheet is the largest single mass of ice on Earth. It covers an area of almost 14 million km2 (5.4 million mi2) and contains 30 million km3 of ice. The continent-wide average surface temperature trend of Antarctica is positive and significant at >0.05 °C (0.09 °F)/decade since 1957.

The Antarctic ice sheet is divided by the Transantarctic Mountains into two unequal sections called the East Antarctic Ice Sheet (EAIS) and the smaller West Antarctic Ice Sheet (WAIS). It would be seabed if the ice sheet were not there. The WAIS is classified as a marine-based ice sheet, meaning that its bed lies below sea level and its edges flow into floating ice shelves. The WAIS is bounded by the Ross Ice Shelf, the Filchner-Ronne Ice Shelf, and outlet glaciers that drain into the Amundsen Sea.

Greenland ice sheet

These measurements came from NASA's Gravity Recovery and Climate Experiment satellite, launched in 2002, as reported by BBC News in August 2006.

Ice sheet dynamics

Ice movement is dominated by the motion of glaciers, whose activity is determined by a number of processes. Their motion is the result of cyclic surges interspersed with longer periods of inactivity, on both hourly and centennial time scales.

Predicted effects of global warming

The Greenland, and possibly the Antarctic, ice sheets have been losing mass recently, because losses by ablation including outlet glaciers exceed accumulation of snowfall. According to the Intergovernmental Panel on Climate Change (IPCC), loss of Antarctic and Greenland ice sheet mass contributed, respectively, about 0.21 ± 0.35 and 0.21 ± 0.07 mm/year to sea level rise between 1993 and 2003.

The IPCC projects that ice mass loss from melting of the Greenland ice sheet will continue to outpace accumulation of snowfall. Accumulation of snowfall on the Antarctic ice sheet is projected to outpace losses from melting. However, in the words of the IPCC, "Dynamical processes related to ice flow not included in current models but suggested by recent observations could increase the vulnerability of the ice sheets to warming, increasing future sea level rise. Understanding of these processes is limited and there is no consensus on their magnitude." More research work is therefore required to improve the reliability of predictions of ice-sheet response to global warming. In 2018, scientists discovered channels between the East and West Antarctic ice sheets that may allow melted ice to flow more quickly to the sea.

The effects on ice sheets due to increasing temperature may accelerate, but as documented by the IPCC the effects are not easily projected accurately and in the case of the Antarctic, may trigger an accumulation of additional ice mass. If an ice sheet were ablated down to bare ground, less light from the sun would be reflected back into space and more would be absorbed by the land. The Greenland Ice Sheet covers 84% of the island, and the Antarctic Ice Sheet covers approximately 98% of the continent. Due to the significant thickness of these ice sheets, global warming analysis typically focuses on the loss of ice mass from the ice sheets increasing sea level rise, and not on a reduction in the surface area of the ice sheets.

Until recently, ice sheets were viewed as inert components of the carbon cycle and were largely disregarded in global models. Research in the past decade has transformed this view, demonstrating the existence of uniquely adapted microbial communities, high rates of biogeochemical/physical weathering in ice sheets and storage and cycling of organic carbon in excess of 100 billion tonnes, as well as nutrients (see diagram).

Global ice sheet

Many or most of Solar System objects are icy. Particularly icy moons have global ice sheets. Earth might have had a global ice sheet as well in its past, during a phase called snowball Earth.

See also
Cryosphere
Quaternary glaciation
Wisconsin glaciation

References

Further reading

External links
 United Nations Environment Programme: Global Outlook for Ice and Snow
 http://www.nasa.gov/vision/earth/environment/ice_sheets.html

Sheet
 
Snow or ice weather phenomena
Sheet
Glaciology
Effects of climate change
Cryosphere